Nicole Beland was the Men's Health "Girl Next Door" until the May 2009 issue. Beland's column from Men's Health has been converted into a book called Ask the Men's Health Girl Next Door. She attended Union College in Schenectady, NY.

She also contributed to its sister publication, Women's Health, as a Deputy Editor, until she left to work at Cosmopolitan as Executive Editor. Along with Ted Spiker, Beland contributed to an advice column on the Women's Health website. A former senior editor at Cosmopolitan and Mademoiselle magazines, she currently lives in Carroll Gardens, Brooklyn.

She is also the author of several books including The Cocktail Jungle: A Girl's Field Guide to Shaking and Stirring (2003), Girl Seeks Bliss (2005), and Sex: The Whole Picture (2005). She has appeared as a health and relationships expert on CNN Headline News, The Early Show, Good Morning America, The Today Show, and The Best Damn Sports Show Period.

Articles for Women's Health

 "A Girl Walks into a Bar", Fall 2004
 "Are You on the Right Pill?", February/March 2005
 "The Pursuit of Happiness", April/May 2005

References

External links
 Nicole Beland on Amazon.com
 Nicole's advice column on Women's Health
 Nicole Beland profile on Gothamist
 "Ask the Men's Health Girl Next Door" featured in USA Today

Year of birth missing (living people)
Living people
Union College (New York) alumni
People from Carroll Gardens, Brooklyn
American women columnists
20th-century American journalists
20th-century American women writers
21st-century American journalists
21st-century American women writers
Writers from Brooklyn